Jean-Pierre Sueur (born 28 February 1947) is a member of the Senate of France, representing the Loiret department.  He is a member of the Socialist Party.

References
Page on the Senate website (in French)

1947 births
Living people
French Senators of the Fifth Republic
Socialist Party (France) politicians
Mayors of Orléans
ENS Fontenay-Saint-Cloud-Lyon alumni
Members of the Académie d'architecture
Senators of Loiret
Politicians from Centre-Val de Loire
Members of Parliament for Loiret